"ISIS" is a song by American rapper Joyner Lucas featuring fellow American rapper Logic, released as the third single from Lucas' debut studio album ADHD (2020) on May 24, 2019. The music video was released the day before.

Background
Before the release of "ISIS", Joyner Lucas and Logic were involved in an ongoing rivalry. As such, the song marks the end of the issues between the two rappers. In 2017, Lucas told Billboard magazine that his relationship with Logic started to sour during their 2016 Tech N9ne collaboration, "Sriracha". The two had since gone on to take multiple shots at each other, including an incident where Lucas claimed that Logic "can rap" but he "tries to prove that he's black too much for me". Billboard noted how, in "ISIS", Logic interpolates Notorious B.I.G.'s "What's Beef" into the chorus and "flips it into talking about the common ground he discovered with Joyner".

Music video
The music video was released alongside the song on May 24, 2019, with Lucas and Logic rapping in uniforms at an army base.

Commercial performance
"ISIS" debuted at number 59 on the US Billboard Hot 100, becoming Joyner Lucas's highest-charting song as a lead artist on the chart.

Charts

Certifications

References

2019 singles
2019 songs
Joyner Lucas songs
Logic (rapper) songs
Song recordings produced by Boi-1da
Songs written by Logic (rapper)
Songs written by Joyner Lucas
Songs written by Boi-1da